Jason Bowles (born November 24, 1982) is an American professional stock car racing driver. He won the NASCAR K&N Pro Series West championship in 2009.

Racing career

Early career
He made his NASCAR West Series debut in the No. 22 Sunrise Ford/Turbo Torq Ford in 2007, posting two wins – one at California Speedway and the other at Miller Motorsports Park – on his way to becoming Rookie of the Year. For 2008 he recorded four wins and five poles, finishing second in the points. In 2009 Bowles won at Phoenix International Raceway, Toyota Speedway at Irwindale and Infineon Raceway, recorded 3 poles, and won the Camping World West Series championship.

NASCAR
For 2010 he no longer had a full-time ride, instead running partial schedules in the K&N Pro Series West and NASCAR Canadian Tire Series. He entered the Toyota All-Star Showdown at Irwindale winning on a late-race pass, the biggest win of his career. 

He made his NASCAR Nationwide Series debut at Phoenix International Raceway in 2009 for Specialty Racing, crashing out and finishing 31st. In 2010 he finished 25th in the spring Phoenix race for RAB Racing. Bowles also ran in three truck races in 2010 with a best finish of 16th.  He ran 3 Nationwide Series races with Rusty Wallace Racing in 2011 in the #64 Toyota. For 2012 he moved up to the Nationwide Series full-time with MacDonald Motorsports, competing for Rookie of the Year in the No. 81; he finished 13th in season points.

In practice and qualifying for the 2013 Toyota/Save Mart 350 at Sonoma Raceway, Bowles substituted for Brian Vickers in the No. 55 Michael Waltrip Racing Toyota, as Vickers was running both the Sonoma race and the Johnsonville Sausage 200 at Road America that weekend.

Motorsports career results

NASCAR
(key) (Bold – Pole position awarded by qualifying time. Italics – Pole position earned by points standings or practice time. * – Most laps led. ** – All laps led.)

Sprint Cup Series

Nationwide Series

 Season still in progress 
 Ineligible for series points

Camping World Truck Series

K&N Pro Series East

K&N Pro Series West

Canadian Tire Series

ARCA Racing Series
(key) (Bold – Pole position awarded by qualifying time. Italics – Pole position earned by points standings or practice time. * – Most laps led.)

References

External links
 
 

Living people
1982 births
People from Ontario, California
Racing drivers from California
24 Hours of Daytona drivers
NASCAR drivers
Rolex Sports Car Series drivers
U.S. F2000 National Championship drivers
International Kart Federation drivers
ARCA Menards Series drivers